Phú An may refer to several rural communes in Vietnam, including:

Phú An, Bình Dương, a commune of Bến Cát
Phú An, An Giang, a commune of Phú Tân District, An Giang
Phú An, Đồng Nai, a commune of Tân Phú District, Đồng Nai
Phú An, Gia Lai, a commune of Đắk Pơ District
Phú An, Hậu Giang, a commune of Châu Thành District, Hậu Giang
Phú An, Thừa Thiên - Huế, a commune of Phú Vang District
Phú An, Tiền Giang, a commune of Cai Lậy District